Zheltura (Zelter) is a rural locality (a selo) in Dzhidinsky District, Republic of Buryatia, Russia. The population was 427 as of 2010. There are 4 streets.

Geography 
Zheltura is located 31 km southwest of Petropavlovka (the district's administrative centre) by road. Tengerek is the nearest rural locality.

References 

Rural localities in Dzhidinsky District